Amir Chak is a village in Kamsaar in the Indian state of Uttar Pradesh.

History 
Kamsar-O-Bar is a region in Tehsil Zamania Dist Ghazipur (U.P.). There is one of the village named "AMIRCHAK". Village Amir Chak was inhabited in the end of seventeenth century by Diler Khan with the help of Janab Deendar Khan ( Dildarnagar is after him) . The pathans of Amir Chak are the descendants of Diler Khan, (Army Chief of Emperor Aurangzeb), came from Delhi. Diler Khan when came to Dildarnagar, He got married with a daughter of a zamindar in Kusi and got land and hence from there his family live here till this date. The ancestors of Diler Khan was Bahlol Lodi, Sikander Lodi and Ibrahim Lodi(last sultan of India). In past Amir Chak was the part of Mauza KUSI but in 2015 it became separate mauza. It comes in "BAR" sub region of "KAMSAR-O-BAR". Following villages come in KAMSAR sub region e.g. Usia, Rakasaha, Tajpur Kurrah, Gorasara, Mania, Khajuri, Kusi, Bhaksi, Jaburna, Dewaitha, Fufuao, Bahuara, Saraila, Chitarkoni, Akhini and following villages come in "BAR" sub region e.g. Dildarnagar, Mircha,  Bara, Dildarnagar, Ramaval, Khiddipur-Mathare, Sikandarpur, Mahend, Pakhanpura, Machhti, Dumri, Beur etc. 
.The pathans of Amir Chak are Afghani Pathans. Pathans of Other village of  Bar sub region are returned from Hindus ancestors.

Afghani pathans are tall, minimum height is above 6 feet , wheatish in color, brave with no non sense attitude, means business, they stand for their commitments, they kiss their deaths which is contrary to black people found in Mircha, there is established link between lodhi dynasty and people from Amir Chak, however Dildarnagar was established by one Hindu Rajput named Nawal Singh hailing from South Bihar, who later converted to Islam during the era of Aurangzeb and took the name of Deendar Khan, who in 1687 founded Deendar Nagar which later was changed to Dildar Nagar.10th Generation of Deendar Khan, Kunwar Nasim Raza Khan confirms that on 7th Muharram in 1110 , bought Village Akhanda, Tappa : Kamsar, Province: Madan Bananas( Zamania) Governate : Ghazipur, State : Allahabad, was bought in 592 Alamgiri Coins which is mentioned in History.It is evident from History that in 1085 Hijri, the then ruler Aurangzeb invited Danish Khan(younger brother of Deendar Khan) and his family to Lahore and with great fanfare declared Danish Khan as his adopted son, resulting in conversion of whole family of Deendar Khan. Deendar Khan who earlier was Jagirdar of Islamgarh expressed his desire to return to his ancestral land, Aurangzeb granted him 1000 foot soldiers, horses and innumerable arms and ammunition and also gave him the title of" Khan or Raja".

Deendarnagar is mentioned in land records till 1839, due to some linguistic error, it got mentioned as Dildar Nagar which is till day.

The matter of fact is whole region of Kamsar O Bar consist of converted Muslims and the families of Mircha have good relationship with them.

Histrorical Population

References

External links 

Cities and towns in Ghazipur district
Villages in Ghazipur district